The 2016 European Masters was a professional ranking snooker tournament that took place between 3–9 October 2016 at the Globus Circus in Bucharest, Romania. It was the sixth ranking event of the 2016/2017 season.

Shaun Murphy made the 121st official maximum break in the second frame of his round two qualifying match against Allan Taylor. It was Murphy's fifth professional maximum break.

11 of the world's current top 16 players qualified for the main stages in Bucharest. Stuart Bingham, Mark Williams, Joe Perry and Kyren Wilson lost in the qualifying rounds in Preston, while new Shanghai Masters champion Ding Junhui withdrew.  Former professional Zak Surety and Daniel Womersley were the only two amateur players to qualify.

Judd Trump won the event by defeating Ronnie O'Sullivan 9–8 in the final. This was Trump's sixth ranking title. Trump made three centuries in the final, the third one being his 400th career century.

Prize fund
The breakdown of prize money from this year is shown below:

 Winner: €75,000
 Runner-up: €35,000
 Semi-final: €17,500
 Quarter-final: €11,000
 Last 16: €6,000
 Last 32: €3,500
 Last 64: €1,750

 Non-televised highest break: £200
 Televised highest break: £2,000
 Total: €350,000

The "rolling 147 prize" for a maximum break stood at £5,000 for the televised stage and at £11,000 for the qualifiers.

Main draw

Final

Gallery

Qualifying
These matches were held between 26 and 28 September 2016 at the Preston Guild Hall in Preston, England. All matches were best of 7 frames.

Round 1

Round 2

Century breaks

Qualifying stage centuries

 147  Shaun Murphy
 143, 136  Marco Fu
 143  Neil Robertson
 133  Mei Xiwen
 128, 117  Ricky Walden
 128  Michael White
 128  Boonyarit Keattikun
 127  Jimmy Robertson
 127  Gary Wilson
 125, 116, 100  Mark Davis
 123, 100  Robin Hull
 123  Stephen Maguire
 122  Mitchell Mann
 114  Judd Trump
 113  John Higgins
 113  David Grace
 112, 109  Mark Joyce

 108  Liang Wenbo
 108  Dominic Dale
 106  Mark King
 104, 101  Michael Holt
 104  Alfie Burden
 104  Duane Jones
 103  Aditya Mehta
 103  Mark Selby
 103  Ryan Day
 102  Fergal O'Brien
 102  Mark Allen
 102  Antony Parsons
 101  David Gilbert
 101  Daniel Wells
 101  Tom Ford
 100  Matthew Selt

Televised stage centuries

 136, 109, 102  Mark Selby
 135, 120, 118, 109, 105, 105, 105  Judd Trump
 129, 118  Ronnie O'Sullivan
 124, 107, 100  Mark Davis
 121, 112  Mark Allen
 118, 104  John Higgins

 112, 103  Neil Robertson
 107  Anthony McGill
 105  Ricky Walden
 103  Liang Wenbo
 101  Rhys Clark

References

2016
2016 in snooker
2016 in Romanian sport
Sport in Bucharest
Snooker in Romania
October 2016 sports events in Europe